Alan Campbell (born 7 July 1971) is a Scottish fantasy novelist.

Biography

Campbell was born and raised in Falkirk, Scotland. He studied computer science at the University of Edinburgh. After graduating, he worked as a software engineer for DMA Design, Visual Sciences, and Rockstar North, developing the video games Body Harvest (for the Nintendo 64), Formula One 2000 (PlayStation), and the Grand Theft Auto series (PC, PlayStation 2). Following the completion of Grand Theft Auto: Vice City, he left to pursue a career in photography and writing.

Campbell's debut novel was Scar Night, the first of the Deepgate Codex trilogy, followed by Iron Angel in 2008, and God of Clocks in 2009. The novella Lye Street is a prequel to the series.

In 2013, Campbell was awarded an Inkpot Award.

Bibliography

Deepgate Codex series
 Scar Night (2006)
 Iron Angel (2008)
 God of Clocks (2009)

Gravedigger Chronicles
 Sea of Ghosts (2011)
 Art of Hunting (2013)

References

External links

Novel synopses, cover art, reviews
REVIEW : Art of Hunting

British fantasy writers
Living people
1971 births
People from Falkirk
Alumni of the University of Edinburgh
Scottish male novelists
Inkpot Award winners